Condemned or The Condemned may refer to:

Legal
 Persons awaiting execution
 A condemned property, or condemned building, by a local authority, usually for public health or safety reasons
 A condemned property seized by power of eminent domain

Media

Film
 Condemned (1923 film), an American silent comedy starring Mildred Davis
 Condemned (1929 film), an American melodrama starring Ronald Colman
 Condemned (1953 film), a Spanish melodrama
 The Condemned (1975 film), a 1975 Austrian-West German drama
 Condemned (1984 film), a Filipino film noir
 The Condemned, a 2007 American action film
 The Condemned 2, a 2015 action film, sequel to the 2007 film
 Condemned (2015 film), an American horror film

Music
 A song from Penetrations from the Lost World (reissue), by Dimension Zero
 A song from A Sense of Purpose by In Flames
 A song from The Powerless Rise by As I Lay Dying

Other media
 "Condemned" (Stargate Atlantis), an episode of the television series Stargate Atlantis
 The Condemned (audio drama), based on the Doctor Who television series
 Condemned: Criminal Origins, a 2005 psychological horror video game
 Condemned 2: Bloodshot, the sequel to the video game

See also
 Condemnation (disambiguation)